Angel of Justice may refer to:

 Raguel (angel), Angel of Justice, mainly of the Judaic traditions
 Lady Justice, an allegorical personification of the moral force in judicial systems

See also
 Angel
 List of angels in theology
 Archangel
 Justice
 Astraea (mythology), goddess of Justice
 Dike (mythology), goddess of Justice
 Themis, goddess whose symbols are the Scales of Justice
 Prudentia, goddess of Justice
 Adikia, goddess of injustice
 Triple deity
 Triple Goddess (neopaganism)

Angels